eX is the debut studio album by Ipecac Loop, released on August 29, 1995 by Fifth Colvmn Records.

Music
Compositions from eX, namely "Backbreaker" and "Clusterfuck", were released on the Forced Cranial Removal, Mind/Body Compilation Volume 2 and The Best of Mind/Body: Electro-Industrial Music From the Internet compilations by Fifth Colvmn and Atomic Novelties. Later "Backbreaker" and "Music Box" were later released on Mind/Body Compilation Volume 3 by Atomic Novelties and DIY Productions and Amduscias by Zenflesh, released respectively in 1996 and 1998.

Reception 
Sonic Boom said "focusing on a minimalistic approach to sound construction Ipecac Loop provides access to realm where a lack aural depth doesn't deter from the overall quality of the music" and "percolating trickles of ambience drip from extreme heights into a swirling pool of radiance sound."

Track listing

Personnel 
Adapted from the eX liner notes.

Ipecac Loop
 Cameron Lewis – instruments, production, engineering, mixing, design

Production and design
 Andre Knecht – mastering
 Adrian Mulvaney – photography

Release history

References

External links 
 
 eX at Bandcamp
 eX at iTunes

1995 debut albums
Fifth Colvmn Records albums